Matrix metalloproteinase-24 is an enzyme that in humans is encoded by the MMP24 gene.

Proteins of the matrix metalloproteinase (MMP) family are involved in the breakdown of extracellular matrix in normal physiological processes, such as embryonic development, reproduction, and tissue remodeling, as well as in disease processes, such as arthritis and metastasis. Most MMP's are secreted as inactive proproteins which are activated when cleaved by extracellular proteinases. However, the protein encoded by this gene is a member of the membrane-type MMP (MT-MMP) subfamily; each member of this subfamily contains a potential transmembrane domain suggesting that these proteins are expressed at the cell surface rather than secreted. This protein activates MMP2 by cleavage. The gene has previously been referred to as MMP25 but has been renamed MMP24.

References

Further reading

Matrix metalloproteinases